Khanegeh may refer to:

Khanegeh, Lorestan
Khanegah, West Azerbaijan

See also

Khanegah